Nanga may be:
Nanga (instrument), an Egyptian musical instrument
Nanga (Japanese painting)
Nanga Brook, Western Australia
Nanga of Kongo, second ruler or manikongo of the Central African kingdom of Kongo
Nanga subcaste of the Sial (tribe) in Pakistan
N'anga, name of African traditional healer in Zimbabwe